Duke University Libraries is the library system of Duke University, serving the university's students and faculty. The Libraries collectively hold some 6 million volumes.

The collection contains 17.7 million manuscripts, 1.2 million public documents, and tens of thousands of films and videos. The Duke University Libraries consists of the William R. Perkins Library, Bostock Library, and the Rubenstein Rare Book & Manuscript Library on West Campus; the Lilly Library and Music Library on East Campus, and the Pearse Memorial Library at the Duke Marine Lab. It also includes the Library Service Center, library offices located in the Smith Warehouse, as well as a few other departments. The professional schools have separately administrated libraries: the Goodson Law Library, Duke Divinity School Library, Ford Library at Fuqua School of Business, and the Seeley Mudd Medical Center Library. The Biological and Environmental Sciences Library was formerly part of the system but in 2009 it closed permanently.

Libraries and departments

William R. Perkins Library

The William R. Perkins Library system has nine branches on campus. It includes a major collection of Confederate imprints.

Roy J. Bostock Library
Bostock Library, named for board of trustees member Roy J. Bostock, opened in the fall of 2005 as part of the University's strategic plan to supplement Duke's libraries.

David M. Rubenstein Rare Book & Manuscript Library
The David M. Rubenstein Rare Book & Manuscript Library holds more than 350,000 rare books, 10,000 manuscript collections, and extensive collections of photography, film, and audio. The library was named after board of trustees member and alumn David M. Rubenstein in 2011.

Divinity School Library

The Divinity School Library is located next to Perkins Library in the Duke Divinity School. It contains 400,000 volumes, as well as various periodicals and other materials to support the study of theology and religion. The library is the host institution for the Religion in North Carolina Digitization project, a collaborative digitization project with Wake Forest University and the University of North Carolina at Chapel Hill, due for completion in 2015.

See also
 David Ferriero

References

 Land, William Goodfellow and George Washington Flowers. (1939). The centennial exhibit of the Duke university library, consisting of material from the George Washington Flowers memorial collection of books and documents relating to the history and literature of the South, April 5-June 5, 1939. Durham, North Carolina: Duke University.

External links

 

 
University and college academic libraries in the United States
Libraries
Libraries in North Carolina
Federal depository libraries